Cantaloupe is a fruit.

Cantaloupe and its variant spellings may also refer to:

Companies
 Cantaloupe, Inc.

In fiction
 the Marquis Canteloupe, fictional nobleman and politician in the Alms for Oblivion novels of Simon Raven

Music
 "Cantaloupe Island", a jazz standard composed by Herbie Hancock and recorded on his 1964 album Empyrean Isles
 Cantaloupe Island (album), an album by French jazz fusion artist Jean-Luc Ponty first released in 1976
 Cantaloupe Music, a record label
 "Cantaloop" (Flip Fantasia), a 1993 song by Us3

People
 Baron Cantilupe, barony by writ
 William de Cantilupe, 1st Baron Cantilupe (1262–1308)
 Viscount Cantelupe, subsidiary title of the Earl De La Warr
 George West, Viscount Cantelupe (1814–1850), eldest son of the 5th Earl
 April Cantelo (born 1923), English soprano
 George de Cantilupe (1252–1273), Lord of Abergavenny
 Jim Cantalupo (1943–2004), American businessman
 Joseph Cantalupo (born 1943), Mafia informant
 Joseph Canteloube (1879–1957), French composer
 Julieta Cantaluppi (born 1985), Italian rhythmic gymnast
 Mario Cantaluppi (born 1974), Swiss footballer and manager
 Thomas de Cantilupe, Bishop of Hereford and Lord Chancellor of England
 William Cantelo (born 1839), British inventor
 Walter de Cantilupe (died 1266), Bishop of Worcester
 William de Cantilupe (died 1239), Anglo-Norman baron
 William de Cantilupe (died 1251), Anglo-Norman baron
 William de Cantilupe (died 1254), Lord of Abergavenny
 William de Cantilupe (died 1375), murdered by his household

Places

France
 Canteloup, Calvados, Normandy
 Canteloup, Manche, Normandy
 Chanteloup (disambiguation), several places
 Canteleu, Normandy
 Canteleux, Pas-de-Calais, Artois
 Cantaloube, hamlet of Villefranche-de-Rouergue, Aveyron
 Canteloube, hamlet of Lacave, Lot

Italy
 Cantalupa, Milan, quarter of Zone 5 of Milan
 Cantalupa, Piedmont
 Cantalupo di Bevagna, Umbria
 Cantalupo in Sabina, Lazio, after which the fruit is named
 Cantalupo Ligure, Piedmont
 Cantalupo nel Sannio, Molise

United Kingdom
 Aston Cantlow, Warwickshire, named for the de Cantilupe family
 Broadhempston, Devon, formerly Hempston Cauntelow
Manor of Broad Hempston, owned by the Cantilupe family
 Cantelowes (ward), London Borough of Camden
 Chilton Cantelo, Somerset, named for the Cantilupe family